The Tashahhud (meaning "testimony [of faith]"), also known as at-Tahiyyat, is the portion of the Muslim prayer where the person kneels or sits on the ground facing the qibla, glorifies God, and greets the messenger and the righteous people of God followed by the two testimonials. The recitation is usually followed by an invocation of the blessings and peace upon the prophet known as Salawat.

Origins 
There is a Hadith, thought to be authentic that states:

Sunni tradition

Hanafi and Hanbali 
A version attributed to Abdullah ibn Masud is used by Sunni Muslims from both the Hanafi and the Hanbali schools, as well as the non-Sunni Ibadi Muslims:

Maliki 
A version attributed to Umar is used by the Maliki school:

Shafi'i 
A version attributed to Ibn Abbas is used by the Shafi'i school:

Shia tradition

Jafari 
The Twelver Shias of the Ja'fari school recite the Tashahhud as:

The Tashahhud is followed by the Salam. The bare minimum is to say 
"".
It is highly recommended, though, to add "" .

It is highly recommended, though, to recite

Zaidi 
For the Zaidi, the middle Tashahhud after the second rakʿah is recited as:

After the last rakʿah, the Zaidi recite the Tashahhud in its full formula:

Quranists 
Some Quranists reject the practice of Tashahhud as an innovation. This view was originally advocated by Rashad Khalifa, and later adopted by different Quranist groups.

See also 

 Shahadah
 Adhan
 Iqamah
 Salawat
 Dhikr
 Peace be upon him

References

External links 

 Learn how to Recite Tashahhud

Salah
Arabic words and phrases
Salah terminology
Islamic prayer
Shia prayers
Statements of faith